Douglas Vandor (born August 25, 1974, in Montreal, Quebec) is a Canadian rower. He participated in the 2012 Summer Olympics in London where he competed in the Men's lightweight double sculls event together with his teammate Morgan Jarvis. They qualified for the C finals, where they came in second place, finishing in 14th place overall.

Post athletic career
In 2018, Vandor was named as Canada's chef de mission for the 2019 Pan American Games in Lima, Peru.

References

1974 births
Anglophone Quebec people
Canadian male rowers
Living people
Olympic rowers of Canada
Rowers at the 2008 Summer Olympics
Rowers at the 2012 Summer Olympics
Rowers from Montreal